Nako is a village in the Himalayas of northern India, located near the Indo-China border in the Trans-Himalayan region of Kinnaur district in Himachal Pradesh. Nako Lake is a prominent feature here where it borders the village. Nako Monastery, dated to 1025, is located in the village as well as several other Buddhist chortens.

Geography

The village is now on a more stable location near the Nako Lake (formed by the slopes of the mountains of Reo Purgyal), compared to the opposite bank across the Nako river where it was located earlier and then shifted because of tectonic upliftment of the site. As of 2002, the village had a population of 416. Nako Monastery in the upper part of the village and the Nako Lake are  important landmarks in the village. Apples and Sun dried apricots are the agricultural produce from the village.

Landmarks

Nako monastery

Nako monastery (Tibetan language:Lob-dpon-zhabrjes ) dated to the 11th century (1025 AD), oriented towards Tibet, similar in style to the Tabo Monastery consists of four large halls of which the oldest and largest is known as Dukhong. It is also known as 'Lotsava Jhakang' meaning "complex of the translator" named so in honour of Rinchen Zangpo who translated Buddhist scriptures from Sanskrit to the Tibetan language. The iconographic art work in the monastery is related to Vajrayana Buddhism. The dukhong's walls have decorations of a complete mandala with "gates, fire-circle and secondary non-Buddhist deities in attendance". To the east of this dukhong there is another hall of smaller size which has a sculpture of Yellow Tara (known as Grolgster)  made in stucco, with its roof and walls painted with mandalas. In the third hall there is an elegant image of Vairochana. Within the complex there is a shrine dedicated to Purgyal, a local deity with attribution as the "spirit of the mountain". Sculptures of five Dhyani Buddhas made out of clay are defied in the main hall where there are also many images.
 

In the earthquake of 1975 the buildings were affected. Many bright artworks in the monastery were vandalized. During this earthquake event roofs of the monastery and other buildings in the village were damaged. Further, during the severe winter season of 1998 the monastery was in near collapse stage. Following these disastrous events, in May 1998, the University of Vienna launched a research Project in association with  the Indian National Trust for Art and Cultural Heritage (INTACH), the Buddhist Association of Nako, and local residents of Nako to carry out restoration works. In July 2002, the Nako Preservation Project (NPP) came to be established for conservation of the monastery and other buildings in Nako.

Nako lake

The lake is an integral part of the Nako village, which is created on the slopes of the Reo Purgyal mountain of the Srikhand range. During the evening twilight hours a very large number of birds flock the lake. There is a rock here which is believed to have the foot print of Padmasambhava., recording his visit to the area. A shrine has been built around this foot print and there is also stucco statue of Padmasambhava above it in addition to murals. The periphery of the lake has plantations of willow and poplar trees. The lake has boating facilities during the summer months and ice skating is practiced on the lake's surface which gets frozen during the winter months.

Chango gompa
It is made up of yak skin.

Trails around Nako
There are shepherd trails from Nako that lead to Chango, Hango and Tashigang village.

References

Bibliography

External links

 

Villages in Kinnaur district